WHHR (92.1 FM) is a Christian radio station licensed to Vienna, Georgia, United States. The station is owned by Radio By Grace, Inc.

References

External links
 

HHR